Babahoyo Canton is a canton of Ecuador, located in the Los Ríos Province.  Its capital is the town of Babahoyo.  Its population at the 2001 census was 132,824.

Demographics
Ethnic groups as of the Ecuadorian census  of 2010:
Mestizo  55.3%
Montubio  32.9%
Afro-Ecuadorian  7.1%
White  4.6%
Indigenous  0.5%
Other  0.3%

References

Cantons of Los Ríos Province